Brad Hill (born 19 November 1986) is an Australian former professional basketball player who played in the National Basketball League (NBL) and the South East Australian Basketball League (SEABL). He currently serves as an assistant coach with the NBL's Cairns Taipans and the QBL's Cairns Marlins.

Professional career
In 2004 and 2005, Hill attended the Australian Institute of Sport and played for the program's SEABL team.

Hill made his NBL debut during the 2004/05 season for the Adelaide 36ers. After three seasons with the 36ers, Hill joined the South Dragons in 2007. However, due to injury, he appeared in just four games for the Dragons. In 2008, he re-joined the 36ers and played with them until 2011. During this time, between 2006 and 2011, Hill played in the SA State League for the Eastern Mavericks.

Between 2011 and 2013, Hill played for the Cairns Taipans. He finished his NBL career with stints in Sydney (2013/14), Wollongong (2014/15), and Melbourne (2015/16).

Hill made his debut for the Mount Gambier Pioneers of the SEABL in 2012. He became a key member of the Pioneers incredible run of 5 National finals and 3 National Championships between 2013 and 2017. After a degenerative ankle injury ended his 2018 SEABL campaign with the Pioneers, Hill retired from playing.

Coaching career
In 2018, Hill joined the Cairns Taipans as an assistant coach. In 2019, he joined the Taipans' QBL feeder team, the Cairns Marlins, as an assistant coach.

References

External links
NBL stats
SEABL stats
CABL stats

1986 births
Living people
Adelaide 36ers players
Australian men's basketball players
Australian Institute of Sport basketball players
Basketball players from South Australia
Cairns Taipans players
Melbourne United players
South Dragons players
Shooting guards
Small forwards
Sydney Kings players
Wollongong Hawks players